Father Cornelius Brendan (Con) Keogh, OAM, (13 July 1921 – 24 November 2011) was an Australian Roman Catholic priest who founded the International Community Mental Health Movement GROW.

Keogh entered the seminary in Springwood, New South Wales, at 18 years of age. Later he studied in Rome, obtaining degrees in philosophy and theology, and was ordained. On his return to Australia he became Professor of Philosophy at his former seminary.

From 1954 Keogh suffered mental illness, and over the next few years he underwent episodes of hospitalisation for his condition. During 1957, whilst he was recovering from one such episode, he began attending meetings of Alcoholics Anonymous, because there was at that stage no other support group available. Along with others who were also recovering from mental illness, Keogh began to develop the programme material and the structured network of support groups which became the GROW organisation. In 1978, GROW spread outside Australia: Keogh established the GROW programme in Illinois. In 2004, Keogh was awarded the Medal of the Order of Australia for his work with GROW.

Keogh resided in Sydney for most of his later years. He died there on 24 November 2011.

References

External links
Fr Con Keogh honoured for helping people rehabilitate themselves
 
 

1921 births
2011 deaths
Australian Roman Catholic priests
Recipients of the Medal of the Order of Australia